Abdullah Al-Usaimi (born 1959) is a Saudi Arabian sports shooter. He competed in the men's 50 metre rifle, prone event at the 1984 Summer Olympics.

References

1959 births
Living people
Saudi Arabian male sport shooters
Olympic shooters of Saudi Arabia
Shooters at the 1984 Summer Olympics
Place of birth missing (living people)
20th-century Saudi Arabian people